Jalan Padang Tembak, Kluang, Federal Route 184, is a federal road in Johor, Malaysia. The road was a part of Johor State Route 16 before being recommissioned as a federal road. The Kilometre Zero of the Federal Route 184 starts at Kampung Serong junctions.

At most sections, the Federal Route 184 was built under the JKR R5 road standard, allowing maximum speed limit of up to 90 km/h.

List of junctions and towns

References

184